The 2016–17 ÖFB-Frauenliga is the 46th season of the women's football top level league in Austria. FSK St. Pölten-Spratzern were the defending champion. They renamed to SKN St. Pölten to appeal a broader region and won their third title in a row this season.

Standings

Top scorers
Six players have scored 10 or more goals.
 Fanny Vágó (SKN St. Pölten Frauen) 21
 Stefanie Enzinger (SK Sturm Graz) 20
 Mateja Zver (SKN St. Pölten Frauen) 16
 Viktoria Pinther (SKN St. Pölten Frauen) 12
 Christine Schiebinger	(SKV Altenmarkt) 11
 Katharina Elisa Naschenweng (SK Sturm Graz) 10

References

External links
 Official website
 Season on soccerway.com

2016-17
2016–17 domestic women's association football leagues
Women
2016–17 in Austrian football
1